Jack Cummings may refer to:

 Jack Cummings (director) (1900–1989), American film producer and director
 Jack Cummings (tennis) (1901–1972), Australian tennis player
 Jack Cummings (baseball) (1904–1962), Major League Baseball player

See also 
 John Cummings (disambiguation)